The Yarumal climbing salamander (Bolitoglossa vallecula) is a species of salamander in the family Plethodontidae.
It is endemic to Colombia.

Its natural habitats are subtropical or tropical moist montane forests, subtropical or tropical high-altitude grassland, pastureland, and heavily degraded former forest.

References

Bolitoglossa
Amphibians of Colombia
Amphibians of the Andes
Endemic fauna of Colombia
Taxonomy articles created by Polbot
Amphibians described in 1963